Osterburg may refer to:

 Osterburg (Altmark), a town in Saxony-Anhalt, Germany
 Osterburg station, a railway station in the town
 Osterburg (Verwaltungsgemeinschaft), a former collective municipality that included the town
 Osterburg (Groothusen), a castle in Lower Saxony, Germany
 Osterburg (Weida), a castle in Weida, Thuringia, Germany
 Osterburg, Pennsylvania, US, a village

See also 
 Osterberg, a municipality in the district of Neu-Ulm, Bavaria, Germany